The Solina Dam is the largest dam in Poland. It is located in Solina of Lesko County in the Bieszczady Mountains area of south-eastern Poland.

History

The San river which runs through the area has a large flood plain and a series of floods prompted the consideration of a dam to regulate the water flow. The first plans for a dam in the region came in 1921 and called for a small dam in Myczkowce. The project was slow to begin and with the start of World War II it was put on hold. After the war ended the plans were revised and now included a larger dam in Solina. Various work began in 1953 and the smaller Myczkowce Dam downstream, which would become a supporting dam, was completed in the years 1956-1960. In 1960 work began based on a design by Feliks Niczke of Energoprojekt Warszawa. The construction was completed in 1969 and cost 1.5 billion of 1969 zlotys.  of roads were also constructed as part of the project.

The dam

Its construction created the largest artificial lake in Poland - Lake Solina. It has four turbines which were initially capable of generating 136 MW of electricity. As a pumped-storage power station, two of the turbines can also reverse flow and send water from the Myczkowce Dam's reservoir back into the Lake Solina for use during peak periods, optimizing power generation. Starting in 1995 efforts have been made to modernize the power plant. The installation of new technologies between 2000 and 2003 and the replacement of the old turbines resulted in the dam currently generating 200 MW of electricity as opposed to 173 MW previously.

The Solina dam is an important tourist attraction of the area. Tours are available and the dam serves as a bridge to the Lake Solina marina.

See also 

 Renewable energy in Poland

References

External links

Energy infrastructure completed in 1968
Dams completed in 1969
Dams in Poland
Lesko County
Buildings and structures in Podkarpackie Voivodeship
Pumped-storage hydroelectric power stations in Poland
Hydroelectric power stations in Poland